The following people have served as Speaker of the Virginia House of Delegates.

List of speakers
 Parties

Acting Speaker
According to Rules 2 and 16 of the House of Delegates, the chair of the Committee on Privileges and Elections serves as Acting Speaker when there is a vacancy in the Speaker's office. This has occurred twice since 1990:
 Ford C. Quillen of Scott County was Acting Speaker from the death of A. L. Philpott on September 28, 1991, until the House met in a special redistricting session in November, when Thomas W. Moss Jr. was elected Speaker.
 Lacey E. Putney of Bedford was Acting Speaker from the resignation of S. Vance Wilkins Jr. on June 15, 2002, until the House met in regular session in January 2003, when William J. Howell was elected Speaker.

List of speakers by time in office (incomplete)

See also
List of speakers of the Virginia House of Burgesses
:Category:Speakers of the Virginia House of Delegates
 List of Virginia state legislatures

References
 

Speakers of the House of Delegates
 
Speakers of the House of Delegates
Virginia